Bedi Kartlisa. Revue de Kartvélologie was an international academic journal specializing in the language, literature, history and art of Georgia (Kartvelology) published from 1948 to 1984. It derived its name from the poem Bedi kartlisa (ბედი ქართლისა; "The Destiny of Georgia") by the 19th-century Georgian Romanticist poet Nikoloz Baratashvili.

Established by Kalistrate Salia and Nino Salia, Georgian émigrés from the Soviet Union, the journal was published exclusively in Georgian until 1957 when it became multilingual in French, English, and German. Sponsored by the French Academy of Sciences and edited by Salia, the journal played a crucial role in the development of Georgian studies in Europe. It was succeeded by the annual Revue des études géorgiennes et caucasiennes established in 1985 by Georges Dumézil and Georges Charachidzé.

The annual journal Georgica covers a similar range of subjects.

References 

Defunct journals
Area studies journals
Kartvelian studies
Georgian Soviet Socialist Republic
Georgian words and phrases
Publications established in 1948
Publications disestablished in 1984
Works about Georgia (country)